Antigua and Barbuda and Mexico are members of the Association of Caribbean States, Organization of American States and the United Nations.

History

Antigua and Barbuda and Mexico established diplomatic relations on 14 September 1984. Since the establishment of diplomatic relations, relations between both nations have taken place primarily in multilateral forums. In July 1995, both nations signed an Agreement for Technical and Scientific Cooperation. In 2004, Antiguan Prime Minister Baldwin Spencer attended the European Union-Latin American and Caribbean Summit in Guadalajara, Mexico. In February 2010, Antiguan Prime Minister Baldwin Spencer returned to Mexico to attend the Mexico-Caribbean Community (CARICOM) summit in Cancún.

In 2014, the Mexican government donated US$5 million to construct affordable homes in Antigua and Barbuda. In May 2016, Antiguan Prime Minister Gaston Browne attended the United Nations Economic Commission for Latin America and the Caribbean held in Mexico City. In 2017, Mexico opened an honorary consulate in St. John's. In June 2017, Antiguan Ambassador to the United States and the OAS, Ronald Sanders, paid a visit to Mexico to attend the 47th General Assembly of the Organization of American States in Cancún.

Each year, the Mexican government offers scholarships for nationals of Antigua and Barbuda to study postgraduate studies at Mexican higher education institutions.

High-level visits
High-level visits from Antigua and Barbuda to Mexico
 Prime Minister Baldwin Spencer (2004, 2010)
 Prime Minister Gaston Browne (2016)
 Foreign Minister Paul Chet Greene (2021)

Trade
In 2018, trade between Antigua and Barbuda and Mexico totaled US$3.8 million. Antigua and Barbuda's main exports to Mexico include: electronic circuits, diesel pumps, air pumps and plastic plates. Mexico's main exports to Antigua and Barbuda include: phones, pasta, malt beer and insecticides. Mexican multinational company, Cemex operates in Antigua and Barbuda.

Diplomatic missions
 Antigua and Barbuda has a non-resident ambassador accredited to Mexico from its capital in St. John's.
 Mexico is accredited to Antigua and Barbuda from its embassy in Castries, Saint Lucia and maintains an honorary consulate in St. John's.

References 

Mexico
Antigua and Barbuda